The State Duma of the Federal Assembly of the Russian Federation of the 3rd convocation is a former convocation of the legislative branch of the State Duma, lower house of the Russian Parliament, elected on 19 December 1999. The 3rd convocation met at the State Duma building in Moscow from January 18, 2000 to December 29, 2003.

Leadership

Until the election of the Chairman of the State Duma of the meeting, the position was filled by the oldest deputy – 79 year-old of Yegor Ligachyov – according to traditions.

On January 18, 2000, the parliament elected Gennadiy Seleznyov as the Chairman of the State Duma.

Factions

Coalitions

In the State Duma at the 3rd convocation, two coalitions functioned at different times as the majority. In both cases, the coalitions were initiated by the "Unity" faction.

The first coalition was formed immediately after the announcement of election results, during the preparations for the first meeting of the new parliament. The "Unity" faction and the Communist Party (the largest in the State Duma) signed a package agreement, according to which they shared the top positions of the Duma and the chairmanships of parliamentary committees. As for "Unity" it was mainly to keep the levers of control of the State Duma from its main competitors at that time - "Fatherland-All Russia". The Communists made an agreement on favorable terms. Later, second coalition was formed,  The so-called "Coalition of Four" which included Unity, Fatherland-All Russia, People’s Deputy, and Russia’s Regions, and comprised exactly half of the Duma.  The latter two of these groups were not parties per se, but rather deputy groups formed in the Duma.

During the session, the parliament consolidated pro-government forces around President Vladimir Putin: the merger of public movements "Unity" and "Fatherland" was announced, which led to corresponding changes in the State Duma. In April 2002, the newly formed majority of the State Duma cleaned house and deprived the Communists of the benefits they received at the beginning. They were deprived of the majority of management positions. This caused a crisis within the Communist Party faction - Chairman of the State Duma Gennady Seleznyov, as well as heads of two committees (Svetlana Goryacheva and Nikolai Gubenko) chose to leave the faction, and to keep their positions.

Major legislation

May 17, 2000: Mikhail Kasyanov was approved as Prime Minister of Russia with 325 votes in favor.
May 14, 2003: Ratification of the Russian-American Strategic Offensive Reductions Treaty with 294 votes in favor.

Committees

28 committees operated in the State Duma at the 3rd convocation.

References

Convocations of the Russian State Duma
3rd State Duma of the Russian Federation